The 2021 Sofia Twenty20 tournament was a  Twenty20 International (T20I) cricket tournament held in Bulgaria in June 2021. The tournament was played at the National Sports Academy in Sofia and was arranged to mark 20 years since the founding of the Bulgarian Cricket Federation. In addition to the hosts Bulgaria, the competing nations were Greece, Romania and Serbia. The tournament consisted of a round-robin stage, followed by semi-finals and a final.

Romania topped the round-robin stage to set up a semi-final match against Serbia, with Bulgaria and Greece playing in the second semi-final. After winning their semi-final against Serbia, Romania defeated Bulgaria by 7 wickets in the final.

Squads

Round-robin

Points table

Matches

Play-offs

1st Semi-final

2nd Semi-final

Final

References

External links
 Series home at ESPNcricinfo

Associate international cricket competitions in 2021